The 2014 Internazionali di Tennis del Friuli Venezia Giulia was a professional tennis tournament played on clay courts. It was the eleventh edition of the tournament which was part of the 2014 ATP Challenger Tour. It took place in Cordenons, Italy between 11 and 17 August 2014.

Singles main-draw entrants

Seeds

 1 Rankings are as of August 4, 2014.

Other entrants
The following players received wildcards into the singles main draw:
  Filippo Baldi
  Flavio Cipolla
  Erik Crepaldi
  Stefano Napolitano

The following player received a special exemption into the singles main draw:
  Alessandro Giannessi

The following player entered into the singles main draw as an alternate:
  Adrian Sikora

The following player entered into the singles main draw as a lucky loser:
  Walter Trusendi

The following players received entry from the qualifying draw:
  Benjamin Balleret 
  Viktor Galović 
  Franko Škugor 
  Adelchi Virgili

Champions

Singles

  Albert Montañés def.  Potito Starace 6–2, 6–4

Doubles

 Potito Starace /  Adrian Ungur def.  František Čermák /  Lukáš Dlouhý 6–2, 6–4

External links
Official Website

Internazionali di Tennis del Friuli Venezia Giulia
Internazionali di Tennis del Friuli Venezia Giulia
Zucchetti